The Edna Adan University (abbreviated EAU) is a private university located in Hargeisa, the capital of Somaliland. The current president of the university is Edna Adan Ismail.

History 
The institution was founded in 2010 by Edna Adan Ismail and still remains as its chancellor. She is also founded Edna Adan Maternity Hospital and Edna Adan Foundation.

Administration 
The University Board of Trustees

The University Chancellor

The University President and CEO

 The University Legal Advisor

The University Vice President - Administration, Finance and Development

 The University Public and International Relations Office
 The University Quality Assurance and Control Office

 The University Director of Finance, HR and Administration
 The University Accountant
 The Procurement and Logistics Office
 The Store Keeper
 The ICT Office
 E-Library
 Library
 The University Administration and Finance Office
 Finance Assistants
 Front Desk-Receptionists
 Archives
 Support Staff

The University Vice President - Academic Affairs 

 Post Graduate Programs
 Office of the Registrar
 Research Office
 Community Service
 Academic Director
 The Faculty Deans and Heads of Departments
 The University Academic Committee

Campus and Location 
The main Edna Adan University campus and Edna Adan University Hospital] are all located along 1, Iftin Road Hargeisa, Maroodi Jeex, Somaliland, Horn of Africa.

The Edna Adan Hospital Foundation is located along 1660 L Street NW Suite 501, Washington, DC 20036, USA.

Faculties and Programs 

 Nursing
 Midwifery
 Public Health
 Pharmacy
 Medical Laboratory Sciences
 Computing and IT
 Business and Accounting

King's Somaliland Partnership on Medicine and Health Sciences 
The Edna Adan University also collaborates with King's College London, through King's Somaliland Partnerships to run Medical Programs. This is one of the largest and long-running global health partnerships. The program is also supported online by MedicineAfrica.

See also
 Edna Adan Maternity Hospital
 Edna Adan Ismail
 Hargeisa Group Hospital

References

External links
Official website 

Universities in Somaliland
Organisations based in Hargeisa
Educational institutions established in 2010
2010 establishments in Somaliland